Castle Shannon is a station on the Red Line of Pittsburgh Regional Transit's light rail network. It is located in Castle Shannon, Pennsylvania. Located away from the suburb's main commercial and residential districts, the station is designed primarily as a commuter stop, with 500 spaces available for park and ride users.

References

External links

Port Authority T Stations Listings

Port Authority of Allegheny County stations
Railway stations in the United States opened in 1984
Red Line (Pittsburgh)